Prism is the fourth extended play by South Korean girl group Rainbow. It was released on February 15, 2016 by DSP Media and distributed by LOEN Entertainment.

Background 
On January 28, Rainbow posted a puzzle teaser on their Facebook page, titled "Can You Guess the Name of the Title Song?". On February 1, they revealed the title song, called "Whoo". On February 5, they posted the first teaser picture for the extended play. On February 12, they released a teaser for the music video for "Whoo". The extended play and official music video for "Whoo" was released on February 15.

Track listing

References

External links 
  

2016 EPs
Rainbow (girl group) EPs
DSP Media albums
Kakao M EPs
Korean-language EPs